Mathieu Vouillamoz (born 3 April 2000) is a Swiss professional ice hockey left winger who is currently playing with Genève-Servette HC of the National League (NL).

Playing career
Vouillamoz, a Valais native, moved to Geneva at 15 to join Genève-Servette HC junior teams, playing with their U17 team for a season and then with their U20 team for 2 seasons. He won 2 Elite Junior A championship titles back-to-back with Geneva in 2017-18 and 2018-19. 

Vouillamoz began the 2019-20 season on the U20 team before signing his first professional contract with Genève-Servette HC on November 26, 2019, agreeing to a 2-year deal. On December 6, 2019, Vouillamoz made his National League debut with Genève-Servette HC in a home game against EHC Biel, his only NL game of the season. He spent the majority of this season on loan with HC Sierre of the Swiss League, dressing up in 41 regular season games (8 points) and 4 additional games in the relegation round before the season was cut short due to the Coronavirus pandemic.

Vouillamoz scored his first NL goal on March 20, 2021, against Ivars Punnenovs of the SCL Tigers in a 4-3 OT win.

On August 9, 2021, Vouillamoz agreed to an early two-year contract extension with Servette through the end of the 2023-24 season.

International play
Vouillamoz represented Switzerland at the 2018 IIHF World U18 Championships.

References

External links

2000 births
Living people
Genève-Servette HC players
HC Sierre players
Swiss ice hockey left wingers
Sportspeople from Valais